Zizau or Zezow is a village in the Murzuk Desert in Murzuq District in southwest Libya. It is located east of Murzuk and just to the southwest of Funqul. A good high road is said to connect Zizau to Traghan, with frequent incrustations of salt. The village was visited by western explorers in the early 1820s who described it at the time as having "merely a few huts".

References

Populated places in Murzuq District
Sahara